Laura Tohe (born 1952) is a Native American author and poet. She is poet laureate of the Navajo Nation for 2015–2019,
and is a professor emerita of English at Arizona State University.

Tohe was born in Fort Defiance, Arizona, the daughter of a Navajo code talker.
She grew up speaking both Diné bizaad/Navajo language and English and was punished in school for speaking her native language due to assimilation. She earned a B.A. from the University of New Mexico in 1975, an M.A. from the University of Nebraska in 1985, and a Ph.D. from the University of Nebraska in 1993. She has been affiliated with Arizona State University since 1994.

Selected works

Books
Making Friends with Water (Nosila Press, 1986)
No Parole Today (West End Press, 1999)
Tséyi' / Deep in the Rock: Reflections on Canyon de Chelly (with photographer Stephen E. Strom, University of Arizona Press, 2005)
Code Talker Stories (Rio Nuevo Publishers, 2012)

Librettos 
 Slayer, A Navajo Oratorio (With M. Grey, Naxos Digital Services US Inc. 2009)

Awards 
 "Tseyi, Deep in the Rock" won the Glyph Award for Best Poetry (2007)
Navajo Nation Poet Laureate (2017)

References

External links 
Personal website

1952 births
Living people
American librettists
Native American poets
Native American women writers
Navajo people
University of Nebraska–Lincoln alumni
University of New Mexico alumni
20th-century American poets
20th-century American women writers
20th-century Native Americans
21st-century Native Americans
20th-century Native American women
21st-century Native American women
Municipal Poets Laureate in the United States